The Farmers' Museum is located in Cooperstown, New York, and is one of the best-known attractions in the town.

Just north of Cooperstown, it overlooks Otsego Lake and recreates rural life from the 19th century through exhibits and interactive workshops.  There are more than two dozen authentic, historic buildings on the grounds, including a tavern, a farmstead, a printing office, a pharmacy, a blacksmith's shop, a doctor's office and a general store.  There are also exhibits of nineteenth-century games, a children's barnyard and the Cardiff Giant.

The Farmers' Museum is home to the Empire State Carousel, a hand-crafted merry-go-round which celebrates New York State's history, culture and environment, built on a vintage 1947 36-foot Alan Herschell carousel mechanism. The carousel is the result of efforts made by carver Gerry Holzman of Islip, NY and over 1,000 volunteers from across New York State. The entire production took over two decades. Its artwork incorporates 25-hand carved animals that represent the agricultural and natural resources of New York State.

History
The site of The Farmers' Museum has been part of a working farm since 1813, when it was owned by James Fenimore Cooper, author of The Last of the Mohicans. Judge Samuel Nelson, whose office is part of The Farmers' Museum Village, bought the farm in 1829 and raised sheep there. Fenimore Farm, as it came to be known, changed hands again in the 1870s, when it was acquired by the Clark family.

In 1918, Edward Severin Clark built a modern, fully equipped complex at Fenimore Farm for his prize herd of cattle. The barn, creamery, and herdsman's cottage are still standing today and are part of the museum complex. Designed by architect Frank Whiting in the Colonial Revival style, these buildings were constructed of local stone. Today, they house museum offices, exhibition spaces, and public areas. The structures are listed on the National Register of Historic Places.

At that time, the museum had 5,000 tools and objects, including important collections amassed by the Otsego County Historical Society; William B. Sprague, founder of the Early American Industries Association; and the Wyckoff family, one of Brooklyn's oldest farming families. Today the museum's collections number more than 23,000 artifacts.

The Farmers' Museum is a private, non-governmental educational organization. It is closely affiliated with its sister organization, Fenimore Art Museum.

Exhibits
The museum has more than 23,000 artifacts reflecting 19th century farm life in central New York. They are housed in over two dozen buildings across the campus.

The museum also includes working exhibits. There are skilled workers printing real documents, such as the rules of baseball, at the print shop, and weavers producing cloth at looms. The smithy works to produce hinges, tools and other products ordered by local farmers. At the pharmacy, insect repellent is produced. The skilled craftspeople are available to answer questions about their trades.

See also

Open-air museum

References

External links
 The Farmers' Museum's web page
  Virtual Exhibit:  The Crossroads Village and Lippitt Farmstead

Museums in Otsego County, New York
Agriculture museums in the United States
Farm museums in New York (state)
Open-air museums in New York (state)
History museums in New York (state)
Museums established in 1944
1944 establishments in New York (state)
Tourist attractions in Otsego County, New York
Blacksmith shops
Clark family